Juniperus californica, the California juniper, is a species of juniper native to southwestern North America.

Description
The bark is ashy gray, typically thin, and appears to be "shredded".

The foliage is bluish-gray and scale-like.

The cones are berrylike,  in diameter, blue-brown with a whitish waxy bloom, turning reddish-brown, and contain a single seed (rarely two or three). The seeds are mature in about 8 or 9 months. This juniper is largely dioecious, producing cones of only one sex, but around 2% of plants are monoecious, with both sexes on the same plant.

The California juniper is closely related to the Utah juniper (J. osteosperma) from further east, which shares the stout shoots and relatively large cones, but differs in that Utah juniper is largely monoecious. Its cones take longer to mature (two growing seasons), and it is also markedly more cold-tolerant.

Distribution and habitat 
As the name implies, it is mainly in numerous California habitats, although its range also extends through most of Baja California, a short distance into the Great Basin in southern Nevada, and into northwestern Arizona. In California it is found in: the Peninsular Ranges, Transverse Ranges, California Coast Ranges, Sacramento Valley foothills, Sierra Nevada, and at higher elevation sky islands in the Mojave Desert ranges. It is also found off of the North American continental shelf, on Guadalupe Island in the Pacific Ocean, where there are less than 10 individuals.

Habitats include: pinyon–juniper woodland with single-leaf pinyon (Pinus monophylla); Joshua tree woodland; and foothill woodlands, in the montane chaparral and woodlands and interior chaparral and woodlands sub-ecoregions.

Conservation 
The species is listed by the International Union for Conservation of Nature as least concern, and not considered globally threatened. However, one of the southernmost populations, formerly on Guadalupe Island off the Baja California Peninsula coast, was almost destroyed by feral goats in the late 19th century, with only a few plants remaining.

Ecology 
J. californica provides food and shelter for a variety of native species, such as turkeys, deer, and many others. However, as the species matures, it becomes too tall to provide adequate food and shelter for deer and other ground animals of similar size. is a larval host for the native moth sequoia sphinx (Sphinx sequoiae).

Uses 
The plant was used as a traditional Native American medicinal plant, and as a food source, by the indigenous peoples of California, including the Cahuilla people, Kumeyaay people (Diegueno), Serrano, and Ohlone people. They gathered the berries to eat fresh and to grind into meal for baking. The wood was also used for sinew-backed bows.

J. californica is cultivated as an ornamental plant, as a dense shrub (and eventual tree) for use in habitat gardens, heat and drought-tolerant gardens, and in natural landscaping design. It is very tolerant of alkali soil, and can provide erosion control on dry slopes. It is also a popular species for bonsai.

References

Further reading 
 Adams, Robert P. (1993): 10. Juniperus californica. In: Flora of North America Editorial Committee (eds.): Flora of North America North of Mexico vol. 2.
 Adams, Robert P. (2004): Junipers of the World: The Genus Juniperus. Trafford Publishing .

External links

 Calflora Database: Juniperus californica (California juniper)
 Gymnosperm Database: Juniperus californica
 Juniperus californica — UC Photos gallery

californica
Trees of the Southwestern United States
Trees of Mexican Pacific Islands
Trees of Baja California
Flora of California
Flora of the California desert regions
Flora of the Great Basin
Flora of the Sierra Nevada (United States)
Natural history of the California chaparral and woodlands
Natural history of the Mojave Desert
Natural history of the California Coast Ranges
Natural history of the Peninsular Ranges
Natural history of the Transverse Ranges
Trees of the Great Basin
Least concern plants
Plants used in Native American cuisine
Plants used in traditional Native American medicine
Pre-Columbian California cuisine
Pre-Columbian Southwest cuisine
Plants used in bonsai
Garden plants of North America
Ornamental trees
Taxa named by Élie-Abel Carrière